Fried dough is a North American food associated with outdoor food stands in carnivals, amusement parks, fairs, rodeos, and seaside resorts.  "Fried dough" is the specific name for a particular variety of fried bread made of a yeast dough; see the accompanying images for an example of use on carnival-booth signs. Fried dough is also known as fry dough, fry bread (bannock), fried bread, doughboys, elephant ears, beaver tails, scones, pizza fritte,  frying saucers, and buñuelos (in the case of smaller pieces). These foods are virtually identical to each other and some yeast dough versions of beignets, and recognizably different from other fried dough foods such as doughnuts or fritters.

Regional variants
In Canadian cuisine, pieces of fried dough are sometimes called beaver tails.  According to Bill Castleman, a writer of books on Canadian word origins, the name referred to quick-baked dough "especially in early 19th-century places where people might camp for one night and where there was no frying pan." In 1978, Pam and Grant Hooker of Ottawa, Ontario, founded the BeaverTails chain of restaurants specializing in the sale of fried dough pastries which are hand stretched to the shape of a beaver's tail. 

In Newfoundland, a province in Eastern Canada, fried dough is referred to as a "touton". A touton /ˈtaʊtən is produced by frying bread dough on a pan with butter or the leftover fat from "scrunchions" (fried preserved pork) and served with dark molasses, maple syrup, or corn syrup. It is traditionally made from leftover bread dough and pan-fried, as opposed to deep-fried.

A smaller Italian variant common in North America is the zeppole.

Similar food is found in Europe, also typically from outdoor stands in fairs. For example, in Croatia, fried dough is known as languši, in Hungary as lángos, in Austria as kiachl, in Germany as Knieküchle while the oliebol is eaten in the Netherlands. In north Spain is typical of Carnival season and has a spiritual connection with it, just like 'roscón' in Christmas or 'arroz con leche' in Easter.

A type of soft, fried dough ball frequently coated in sugar can be found in some Chinese restaurants in New York. These dough balls are referred to by any one of a number of names, including but not necessarily limited to "sugar biscuits", "Chinese doughnuts", or the simpler "fried bread".

Turkic countries in Central Asia also have a similar food called Boortsog or Pişi.

In New Zealand and other areas such as Hawaii, the Māori people cook Parāoa Parai, a fry bread that is a traditional part of a Matariki feast.

Preparation
Fried dough is made by deep-frying a portion of risen yeast dough. The dough acquires an irregular, bubbly appearance from being fried.

The dough may then be sprinkled with a variety of toppings, such as granulated sugar, powdered sugar, cinnamon, fruit sauce, chocolate sauce, cheese, maple syrup, whipped cream, tomato sauce (with optional grated Parmesan cheese), garlic butter, lemon juice, honey, butter, nuts, or a combination of these.

Gallery

See also
 Beignet
 Funnel cake
 Poori
 Shelpek
 Youtiao
 Zeppole
 List of deep fried foods
 List of fried dough foods

References

External links

St. Petersburg (Florida) Times article, Distinction between funnel cakes and elephant ears

American desserts
!
Canadian cuisine
Canadian desserts